James David Blackley (born 1927 in Edinburgh) was a jazz-focused drumkit teacher.

Blackley lived and taught in Barrie, Ontario, Canada, offering monthly sessions to Canadian students and 10-day master classes to professional musicians from around the globe.

References

External links
Jim Blackley's website

1927 births
Living people
Canadian male drummers
Canadian jazz drummers
Musicians from Barrie
Musicians from Edinburgh
Canadian male jazz musicians
Scottish drummers
Scottish emigrants to Canada